Lyric Theatre or Lyric Theater may refer to:

Australia
Lyric Theatre, Adelaide, former open-air cinema in Grote Street, Adelaide, 1912–c.1914
 Lyric Theatre, Brisbane part of the Queensland Performing Arts Centre, in Brisbane, Queensland
Lyric Theatre, Hilton, former name of the Star Theatres in Hilton, a suburb of Adelaide, South Australia
 Lyric Theatre, Sydney (1911)
 Sydney Lyric theatre, within The Star casino in Sydney, New South Wales

Canada
 Lyric Theater (Swift Current) in Saskatchewan

Hong Kong
 Lyric Theatre, The Hong Kong Academy for Performing Arts

Ireland
 Lyric Theatre, Dublin

United Kingdom
 Lyric Theatre, Belfast in Belfast (also known as the Lyric Players' Theatre)
 Lyric Theatre (Hammersmith) in Hammersmith, London
 Lyric Theatre, London
 Lyric Theatre, part of the Lowry in Salford

United States
 Lyric Theatre and Cultural Arts Center (Lexington, Kentucky)
 Lyric Theatre (Anniston, Alabama), listed on the National Register of Historic Places (NRHP) in Calhoun County, Alabama
 Lyric Theater (Birmingham, Alabama), see Alabama Theatre
 Lyric Theatre (Harrison, Arkansas)
 Lyric Theater (Miami), Florida
 Lyric Theatre (Stuart, Florida)
 Lyric Opera House, Baltimore
 Lyric Theater (Traverse City, Michigan), now the State Theatre in Traverse City, Michigan
 Lyric Theatre, Virginia, Minnesota, now the Lyric Center for the Arts
 Lyric Theater (Boonville, Missouri), listed on the NRHP in Cooper County, Missouri
 Lyric Theatre (Kansas City, Missouri)
 Lyric Theatre (New York City, 1903), now demolished
 Lyric Theatre (New York City, 1998)
 Lyric Theatre (Oklahoma City, Oklahoma)
 Lyric Theatre, Allentown, Pennsylvania, now the Miller Symphony Hall
 Lyric Theatre (Blacksburg, Virginia)